Raleigh is an unincorporated community in Washington Township, Rush County, in the U.S. state of Indiana.

History
Raleigh was platted in 1847. The community's name comes from Raleigh, North Carolina.

A post office was established at Raleigh in 1847, and remained in operation until it was discontinued in 1902.

Geography

References

Unincorporated communities in Rush County, Indiana
1847 establishments in Indiana
Populated places established in 1847
Unincorporated communities in Indiana